Saint-Martin-le-Redon (Languedocien: Sent Martin lo Redond) is a commune in the Lot department in south-western France.

See also
Communes of the Lot department

References

Saintmartinleredon